Onur Dinç (born 24 July 1991), better known by his stage name Khontkar, is a Turkish rapper, songwriter and music producer.

Discography

Studio albums 
 100 (2018)
 NOBODI (2015)

EPs 
Fire Department (2022) (with Downtown Dion)
RedKeyGang la Familia 2 (2020) (ft. Bixi Blake, Metth, KÖK$VL, Young Bego and others )
RedKeyImmortalGang (ft. Young Bego) (2020)
Trap Kont 2.5 (2020)
TURKGLISH (EP) (ft. Myndless Grimes) (2019)
RDKYSZN EP (2019)
Everything is on the Table (2017) (ft. Bixi Blake)
WHOISTHAT EP (2015)

Mixtape albums 
PLA4: THE VISION (2021)
PLA4: Prelude (2021)
NOT TO BE RELEASED (2020)
Puffin Like An Animal 3: Back to the Streets (2018)
Puffin Like An Animal 2: Probation Time (2015)
Trap Kont 2 (2015)
Trap Kont (2014)
Puffin Like An Animal (2013)
ChoppaLand Vol.2 (2011)
ChoppaLand Vol.1 (2011)
CrimeLand Mixtape (2011)

Singles and featurings 
 İZMİR CONFIDENTIAL 2 (2023)  (ft. Yula & Dous)
 Küvet (2022)
 Plugged In (2022) (ft. Myndless, Fumez The Engineer)
 Darısı Başına (2022)
 Şapşal Diss (2022)
 Istanbul (2022) (ft. Downtown Dion, Harry Fraud)
 Born Ready (64 Bars) (2022) (ft. GOKO!)
 8+1 (2022) (ft. Keskin)
 ÜSTÜNDE NE VAR (2021) (ft. Kozmos)
 SUÇ (2021) (ft. Kimera)
 Hiç Uğraşma (2021)
 ANTEN FREESTYLE (PLA4 INTRO) (2021)
 Sis (2021) (ft. Bixi Blake)
lil şam (Alayına diss) (2021)
WAVE GODS (2021) (ft. Young Bego)
RedKeyGang La Familia 2 (2020) (RedKeys Music Album)
TATTOO (2020) (ft. Zen-G)
Hennessy (2020) (ft. Ceg)
Sence Neden (2020) (ft. Bixi Blake, Young Bego, Metth, KÖK$VL)
Zengin (2020)
Fight Kulüp 2 (2020) (ft. Killa Hakan, Massaka, Summer Cem, Contra, Anıl Piyancı)
Bang Bang (2020) (ft. Killa Hakan)
Kavga (2020) (ft. uuR)
Yaratık (2020) (ft. Corr)
Umrumda Değil (2020) (ft. Kozmos)1M FREESTYLE (2019)Yolumuz Yol Değil (2019) (ft. Lil Zey)Nothin' Can Do About It (2019)
 Gelemem (2019) (ft. Grogi)
 Fuego (2019) (ft. Furkan Karakılıç)RMW (2019) (ft. Fornicras)
 METFLIX (2019) (ft. Metth)Geldiğim Yer (2019)Sar Başa (Original film music) (2019)Beamer Boi (ft. Myndless Grimes) (2019)Altın Diş (2019)RDKYSZN FREESTYLE (2019)JENGA (2019) (ft. Ben Fero)Görmedin Böylesini (2019) (ft. Keişan)Güzelce (2019) (ft. Deli Mi Ne?)Legal (2018)Para Vermem (2018) (ft. Metth)Çıktığım İlk Gün (2018)Saçkolik Adam (2018) (ft. SaçkolikAdam)Yok Ötesi (2018) (ft. Young Bego, Metth, Tahribad-ı İsyan, Emza, Emcey & Kasetcalar)Kime Ne (2018)Hiçbir Şeyim Yok (2017)Mutfak I  (ft. Young Bego) (2017)Mutfak II (ft. Young Bego) (2017)Karma (ft. Bixi Blake) (2016)Hakettiğimi Ver (ft. Metth) (2015)Yeah Yeah (2015)Circle'' (2013)

Filmography

Awards and nominations

References

External links 
 

Living people
1991 births
Turkish rappers
Turkish hip hop
Turkish lyricists
Turkish male singers
People from İzmir